The Knysna banana frog (Afrixalus knysnae) is a species of frog in the family Hyperoliidae.
It is endemic to South Africa.

Habitat
Its natural habitats are temperate forests, Mediterranean-type shrubby vegetation, freshwater marshes, intermittent freshwater marshes, arable land, water storage areas, and ponds.
It is threatened by habitat loss.

The Knysna banana frog is a species known from around 7 locations at low altitude (< 250 m asl) on the south coast of South Africa on either side of the border between the Eastern Cape and Western Cape provinces. To the extent of scientists knowledge we know that the occurrence rate is 1,756 km².   The area of occupancy has not been formally calculated but is known to be declining as some sites (like Covie) are presumed lost as no adults or tadpoles have been found there for at least three years. Although some sites are pristine, others are threatened by alien vegetation.  Banana frogs are native to South Africa (Eastern Cape Province, Western Cape Province).

They live in coastal mosaic of vegetation types, including mountain fynbos heathland, and forest. The frogs breed in small dams and shallow semi-permanent water with much emergent vegetation and even in well vegetated ornamental garden ponds; it is suspected that this species requires high water quality for breeding.

Habitat is declining due to encroachment by urban development, alien invasive vegetation and chemical pollution. Species in this genus deposit between 20 and 50 eggs on vegetation above the water. Tadpoles emerge, drop into the water and remain there until metamorphosis.

Identification
The Knysna banana frog has a creamy and yellow color with lateral brown stripes. Females have a smoother texture than males.

Population
Population trends are unknown: since there has been a rapid decline in population it is hard to tell if urban development, alien invasive vegetation, chemical pollution, or a combination of these have been the sole reason of the decline and therefore affect the population trend.

The distribution of the species tends to be severely fragmented as no one site holds more than 50% of the individuals and the distances between subpopulations are too great for dispersal within one generation. When scientists visited a site at Covie they found that the frogs have not produced any individuals (adults or tadpoles) for three years. It seems likely that this subpopulation has become extinct, but further visits are required to substantiate this; just because this area seems to be extinct does not mean the entire species is extinct. The cause for this disappearance is as yet unknown, but change in water quality is suspected as a possible reason.  This is most likely due to urbanization.

The main threat is habitat loss due to urban and recreational development, afforestation, invasive vegetation, agricultural expansion and chemical pollution. These threats are likely to act locally on breeding sites. Droughts may cause additional stresses for this species.

Diet
The species diet is chiefly insects.

Conservation actions
There are many important questions that are still unanswered; however, attention must be paid to the effects water quality changes cause to the species. Less urban development, alien invasive vegetation and chemical pollution will help the frog population thrive but may not reverse the decreasing trend of this population.

References

Sources
 Bergmann, Travis; Zimkus, Breda; Gale Rosen, Daniel. 2012. Afrixalus knysnae. African Amphibians Lifedesk

Afrixalus
Endemic amphibians of South Africa
Taxonomy articles created by Polbot
Amphibians described in 1954